Lalchand Fulamali (born November 1935) is an Indian politician, hailing from Brahmanbahara village in Birbhum District. Fulamali became a member of the Communist Party of India in 1957 and represented the party in the West Bengal Legislative Assembly from 1971 to 1977.

Youth
Fulamali was born in Bramhanbahara. His father was Nanigopal Fulamali. He was educated at Bramhanbahara Primary Vidyalaya and completed the 4th grade .

Political worker
Fulamali became a member of the CPI in 1957. He was active in the local area and became a member of the gram panchayat ('village council'). In 1962 he was jailed during a food movement. Fulamali stood as the CPI candidate in the Mayureswar (SC) constituency in the 1967 West Bengal Legislative Assembly election; with 5,738 votes (19.28%) he finished in third place behind the Congress and CPI(M) candidates. He did not contest the subsequent 1969 West Bengal Legislative Assembly election. From 1967-1970 he was arrested at a number of times.

Legislator
He was elected to the West Bengal Legislative Assembly in the 1971 election and the 1972 election from the Mayureswar (SC) constituency. In 1971 he obtained 10,925 (35.13%) defeating Congress, CPI(M) and Congress(O) candidates. In 1972 he obtained 15,089 (50.74%), defeating the CPI(M) and Congress(O) candidates.

Later period
Fulamali lost the Mayureswar (SC) seat in the 1977 West Bengal Legislative Assembly election, where he finished in third place with 4,760 votes (13.60%). As of 2014 Fulamali was involved in an all-party committee demanding to secure a hospital at Mayureswar.

References

1935 births
Living people
Communist Party of India politicians from West Bengal
West Bengal MLAs 1971–1972
West Bengal MLAs 1972–1977
People from Birbhum district
Prisoners and detainees of India